The Central Coast Mariners Academy (CCMA) is the youth system of Central Coast Mariners FC based in , Australia. The academy teams play the Y-League and the National Premier Leagues, the highest level of youth football in Australia. Senior players occasionally play in the academy side, as in the case when they're recovering from injury. Ray Junna is the current academy manager. They train at the Central Coast Mariners Centre of Excellence and play the majority of their home games there. On occasion, they also play at Pluim Park.

Academy team history

First Academy (2012–2014)
Central Coast Mariners Academy was formed as a joint venture between the Mariners and Central Coast Football to provide a junior development pathway to the NYL and A-League sides. Prior to 2012 the academy existed solely as a junior side; however in 2012 it was accepted to participate in the New South Wales Premier League. In October 2012 the club announced that Joey Peters had been appointed as senior coach. The club finished tenth from twelve clubs in its first two seasons.

CCMA prided themselves on producing talented young players and providing a pathway for Central Coast Mariners in the Hyundai A-League.  Based on appearances for CCMA 15 year old Daniel McFarlane earned trials in the UK with Swansea City and Birmingham City.  Patrick Zwaanswijk signed up McFarlane up for the CCMA in the National Youth League. Local players Steve Whyte, Josh Forbes, Bradley Wilson and Nathan Verity also made sufficient impressions in the NSWPL season to earn them a contract in the NYL squad.

Following disputes between the Mariners and Central Coast Football over technical and financial aspects of the program, the Football NSW licence to run the representative side on the Central Coast was handed back to Central Coast Football in August 2014 and the Academy program was closed.

2015–present
A competitions review conducted by Football NSW in 2015 recommended that academy sides from Sydney FC and Western Sydney Wanderers be included in the National Premier Leagues NSW competitions, with the inclusion of a Central Coast side to be determined between the Mariners and Central Coast Football. The Mariners subsequently applied for entry to the NPL and SAP in August 2015 and were accepted from the 2016 season onwards, replacing Central Coast FC.

Players

Seasons

Honours
Youth
 NPL 2/NSW League One Premiership
Runners-up: 2014
Premiers: 2020, 2022
Champions: 2020

Under-23s
 Y-League Premiership
Premiers: 2009–10, 2011–12
Runners-up: 2010–11, 2012–13

Academy
 Football NSW League One Youth U-20 Premiership
Premiers: 2015, 2018,  2022
Runners-up: 2019
Champions: 2020
 Football NSW League One Youth U-20 Championship
Champions: 2015
 Football NSW League One Youth U-18 Premiership
Premiers: 2014, 2017, 2018
Runners-up: 2019
 Football NSW League One Youth U-18 Championship
Champions: 2014, 2015, 2018
Runners-up: 2017

See also
Central Coast Mariners FC
Central Coast Mariners FC (W-League)

References

External links

National Premier Leagues clubs
A-League National Youth League

Association football clubs established in 2012
2012 establishments in Australia
Central Coast Mariners FC
Sport on the Central Coast (New South Wales)
Soccer clubs on the Central Coast, New South Wales